Chyorny Yar is a rural locality (a selo) in Kishertskoye Rural Settlement, Kishertsky District, Perm Krai, Russia. The population was 159 as of 2010. There is 1 street.

Geography 
Chyorny Yar is located 20 km southeast of Ust-Kishert (the district's administrative centre) by road. Chernoyarskaya Odina is the nearest rural locality.

References 

Rural localities in Kishertsky District